The 2019 Asian Men's Club Volleyball Championship  was the tenth edition of the Asian Men's Club Volleyball Championship, an annual international volleyball club tournament organised by the Asian Volleyball Confederation (AVC) with Chinese Taipei Volleyball Association (CTVA). The tournament was held in Taipei, Taiwan, from 18 to 26 April 2019. The champions qualified for the 2019 FIVB Volleyball Men's Club World Championship.

Qualification
Following the AVC regulations, The maximum of 16 teams in all AVC events will be selected by 
 1 team for the organizer
 10 teams based on the rankings of the previous championship
 5 teams from each of 5 zones (with a qualification tournament if needed)

Qualified associations

Participating teams
The following teams were entered for the tournament.

Pools composition

Pool standing procedure
 Number of matches won
 Match points
 Sets ratio
 Points ratio
 If the tie continues as per the point ratio between two teams, the priority will be given to the team which won the last match between them. When the tie in points ratio is between three or more teams, a new classification of these teams in the terms of points 1, 2 and 3 will be made taking into consideration only the matches in which they were opposed to each other.

Match won 3–0 or 3–1: 3 match points for the winner, 0 match points for the loser
Match won 3–2: 2 match points for the winner, 1 match point for the loser

Venues
 University of Taipei Gymnasium, Taipei, Taiwan
 National Taipei University of Education Gymnasium, Taipei, Taiwan

Pool standing procedure
 Number of matches won
 Match points
 Sets ratio
 Points ratio
 Result of the last match between the tied teams

Match won 3–0 or 3–1: 3 match points for the winner, 0 match points for the loser
Match won 3–2: 2 match points for the winner, 1 match point for the loser

Preliminary round
All times are Taiwan National Standard Time (UTC+08:00).

Pool A

|}

|}

Pool B

|}

|}

Pool C

|}

|}

Pool D

|}

|}

Classification round
 All times are Taiwan National Standard Time (UTC+08:00).
 The results and the points of the matches between the same teams that were already played during the preliminary round shall be taken into account for the classification round.

Pool E

|}

|}

Pool F

|}

|}

Pool G

|}

|}

Pool H

|}

|}

Final round
 All times are Taiwan National Standard Time (UTC+08:00).

13th–14th places

13th place match

|}

9th–12th places

9th–12th semifinals

|}

11th place match

|}

9th place match

|}

Final eight

Quarterfinals

|}

5th–8th semifinals

|}

Semifinals

|}

7th place match

|}

5th place match

|}

3rd place match

|}

Final

|}

Final standing

Awards

Most Valuable Player
 Alireza Jalali (Shahrdari Varamin)
Best Setter
 Parviz Pezeshki (Shahrdari Varamin)
Best Outside Spikers
 Michał Kubiak (Panasonic Panthers)
 Marcus Costa (Al-Rayyan)

Best Middle Blockers
 Mohammad Razipour (Shahrdari Varamin)
 Ashwal Rai (Chennai Spartans)
Best Opposite Spiker
 Kunihiro Shimizu (Panasonic Panthers)
Best Libero
 Takeshi Nagano (Panasonic Panthers)

See also
 List of sporting events in Taiwan

References

Asian Volleyball Club Championship
International volleyball competitions hosted by Taiwan
2019 in Taiwanese sport
V